Jack Frost is an Austrian doom/ gloom rock band from Linz, Upper.

Musical style 
According to music critic Peter Heymann, the basics of the musical style of Jack Frost is gloomy, sad guitars, deep vocals and discreet rhythm section. Markus Eck described the creative team as "fragile, melodic, depressing, dull music".

Members 
Gary Gloom - Guitars
Collossos Rossos (Martin Kollross) - Drums (1993–present)
Mournful Morales (Robert Hackl) - Guitars (1993–present)
Phred Pfinster	(Manfred Klahre) - Vocals, Bass (1993–present)

Discography

Demos
Maelstrom (1995)

EPs
Blackest  (Tour Edition 2015)
The Fall (2017)

Studio albums	 
Eden (1995)	 
Elsewhere	(1996)	 
Glow Dying Sun (1999)	 
Gloom Rock Asylum	(2000)	 
Self Abusing Uglysex Ungod	(2002)	 
Wannadie Songs (2005)	 
My Own Private Hell (2008)	 
Mélaina Cholé (2015)

References

External links
Official Website
Bandcamp.com
Myspace Official
Official site @ archive.org

Austrian rock music groups